Ozothamnus leptophyllus, commonly known as tauhinu or cottonwood, is an endemic shrub of New Zealand. Tauhinu is fast-growing, reaching 2 metres in height and is a common plant of coastal farmland. This species is host to the larvae of the New Zealand endemic moth Homoeosoma anaspila.

References

leptophyllus
Flora of New Zealand